Catapsephis is a genus of moths of the family Crambidae.

Species
Catapsephis apicipuncta Hampson, 1899
Catapsephis flavizonalis Hampson, 1917
Catapsephis leucomelaena Hampson, 1917
Catapsephis melanostigma Hampson, 1912
Catapsephis subterminalis Hampson, 1917

References

Pyraustinae
Crambidae genera
Taxa named by George Hampson